René Hubert (October 7, 1895 – June, 1976) was a Swiss costume designer. He was nominated for two Academy Awards for his work on costumes.

He designed for many films from 1925 to 1964; he often designed for Gloria Swanson. Shirley Temple danced the 'Hula' in the film "Curly Top" wearing a grass skirt ensemble designed by René Hubert.

Oscar nominations

27th Academy Awards—In the category of Best Costumes-Color. Nominated for Désirée, nomination shared with Charles LeMaire. Lost to Gate of Hell.
37th Academy Awards—In the category of Best Costumes-Black and White. Nominated for The Visit. Lost to The Night of the Iguana.

External links

References

Costume designers
1895 births
1976 deaths
People from Frauenfeld
Swiss expatriates in the United States